Delamarentulus is a genus of proturans in the family Acerentomidae.

Species
 Delamarentulus barrai Tuxen, 1979
 Delamarentulus pachychaetus Tuxen, 1979
 Delamarentulus tristani (Silvestri, 1938)

References

Protura